Marie-Thérèse Dancourt (1663 – 1725), was a French stage actress. 

She was engaged at the Comédie-Française in 1685. 

She became a Sociétaires of the Comédie-Française in 1685. 

She retired in 1720.

References 

1663 births
1725 deaths
17th-century French actresses
18th-century French actresses
French stage actresses